Monochamus aparus is a species of beetle in the family Cerambycidae. It was described by Karl Jordan in 1903, originally under the genus Bixadus. It is known from the Democratic Republic of the Congo, Cameroon, and Gabon.

References

aparus
Beetles described in 1903